Norman Edward Jones was an English professional footballer of the 1920s.

A native of Liverpool, Jones is known to have briefly played for Derby County in 1922–23, but subsequently spent four seasons of his career at Gillingham (1923–27).

References

Year of birth missing
Year of death missing
Footballers from Liverpool
English footballers
Association football wing halves
Walker Celtic F.C. players
Gillingham F.C. players
Derby County F.C. players
English Football League players
Place of death missing